Jason Alexander Shiell (born October 19, 1976) is an American former professional baseball pitcher. He played in Major League Baseball (MLB) for the San Diego Padres, Boston Red Sox and Atlanta Braves.

Career
Shiell attended Windsor Forest High School in Savannah, Georgia. He was selected by the Atlanta Braves in the 48th round of the 1995 MLB draft. He pitched in the Braves' farm system from 1995 through 1999, reaching the Class A-Advanced level. In December 1999, he was part of a multi-player trade with the San Diego Padres. He pitched in the minor leagues for the Padres in 2000 and 2001, reaching the Double-A level. In 2002, pitched at the Triple-A level, and was a late-season call-up to the Padres, appearing in three MLB games while allowing four runs in  innings (27.00 ERA).

In October 2002, Shiell was claimed off of waivers by the Boston Red Sox. In 2003, he pitched for Boston at the Triple-A level, and made 17 MLB appearances (2–0 record with 4.63 ERA in  innings). One highlight of his MLB career came on April 27, 2003, when he picked up his only MLB save during an extra innings win over the Angels. 
He underwent Tommy John surgery in May 2004, and became a free agent in October 2004. As a result of the surgery, he did not pitch professionally in 2004 or 2005.

In 2006, he resumed pitching professionally with the Somerset Patriots of the Atlantic League of Professional Baseball, until his contract was purchased by the Atlanta Braves in June 2006. He pitched in Triple-A for Atlanta, and made four MLB appearances with the Braves (0–2 with 8.62 ERA in  innings). He again became a free agent in October 2006.

Shiell spent the 2007 season with the Kansas City Royals organization, at the Double-A and Triple-A levels. His final professional season was 2008, when he pitched in the Milwaukee Brewers organization, again at the Double-A and Triple-A levels. He was released by Milwaukee on August 14, 2008.

Overall, Shiell appeared in 24 MLB games, compiling a 2–2 record with 6.92 ERA in  innings pitched. He played in 294 minor league games, where he was 43–44 with 3.85 ERA in  innings.

References

External links

1976 births
Living people
Atlanta Braves players
Boston Red Sox players
Nashville Sounds players
San Diego Padres players
Major League Baseball pitchers
Baseball players from Savannah, Georgia
Gulf Coast Braves players
Danville Braves players
Macon Braves players
Myrtle Beach Pelicans players
Portland Beavers players
Pawtucket Red Sox players
Richmond Braves players
Wichita Wranglers players
Omaha Royals players
Huntsville Stars players
Somerset Patriots players